Ziviyeh (also Romanized as Zīvīyeh; also known as Zīveh) is a village in Gol Tappeh Rural District, Ziviyeh District, Saqqez County, Kurdistan Province, Iran. At the 2006 census, its population was 304, in 67 families. The village is populated by Kurds.

References 

Towns and villages in Saqqez County
Kurdish settlements in Kurdistan Province